Sechserpack is a German television comedy sketch show that was first shown on Sat.1 between 2003 and 2009.

Overview

Each episode features numerous short sketches, all with a common theme. The cast consisted of the sextet Emily Wood, Mirco Reseg, Thomas Held, Hanno Friedrich, Shirin Soraya and Nina Vorbrodt, hence the name of the show. Several of the sketches featured recurring characters, including a female sergeant major who often orders one of her men to give a definition of a particular episode's theme.

Music

The show's theme music is Five Get Over Excited by The Housemartins.

See also
List of German television series

External links
 

German comedy television series
2003 German television series debuts
2009 German television series endings
German-language television shows
Sat.1 original programming